Cho Yoon-je is a South Korean diplomat who served as the South Korean ambassador to the United States between 2017–2019. He was appointed as South Korea's ambassador to the U.S. in 2017 by South Korean president Moon Jae-in.

Biography

Cho is known for his deep and wide expertise on the global economy and finance. Cho accumulated his experience in the economic and financial fields by working at such global organizations as the International Bank for Reconstruction and Development, and the International Monetary Fund. Cho served as Ambassador to the United Kingdom from 2005 to 2008 and as an economic adviser to former President Roh Moo-hyun from 2003 to 2005. He also headed Moon Jae-in's policy think tank during the 2017 South Korean presidential election. He is also an honorary professor of international studies at Sogang University.

See also
South Korea–United States relations

References 

Living people
South Korean diplomats
Ambassadors of South Korea to the United States
1952 births
20th-century South Korean economists
Academic staff of Sogang University
Ambassadors of South Korea to the United Kingdom
Seoul National University alumni
Stanford University alumni
21st-century South Korean economists